The Protégé is a 2021 American action thriller film directed by Martin Campbell, written by Richard Wenk, and starring Maggie Q, Michael Keaton, Samuel L. Jackson, Patrick Malahide, David Rintoul, Ori Pfeffer, Ray Fearon, Caroline Loncq, and Robert Patrick. The film is about Anna, who was rescued as a child by the legendary assassin Moody, and is now the world's most skilled contract killer. However, when Moody is brutally killed, she vows revenge for the man who taught her everything she knows. The film was released on August 20, 2021 by Lionsgate. It received mixed reviews from critics and grossed $8 million at the box office.

Plot
In 1991, international assassin Moody Dutton discovers a child named Anna in the aftermath of a gang massacre in Da Nang, Vietnam. Thirty years later, Moody has raised Anna as his apprentice, while she runs a rare book shop in London as a cover.

After celebrating Moody’s 70th birthday at his English manor, Anna gives him a guitar owned by Albert King, and he asks her to track down a person of interest named Lucas Hayes. Anna enlists her contact Benny to investigate Lucas, and encounters the mysterious Michael Rembrandt at her bookstore. Soon after, Anna finds Moody and Benny murdered, recovers files Moody hid from his killers, and survives a hit at her store.

The files indicate that Lucas’s father Edward was a past target killed by Moody in Da Nang. Anna travels there and convinces old associate Billy Boy to help her confront Jossino Vohl, Edward’s business partner who took over their company after Edward's death. She meets with Vohl and his lawyer, Duquet, but Duquet unexpectedly kills Vohl and takes Anna prisoner, demanding to know why she is seeking Hayes. During her captivity, she is visited again by Rembrandt; it is revealed that Rembrandt and Duquet are rivals working for the same man. He tells her he was not involved in Moody's death or the shooting at her store, but that she should drop her quest to find Lucas.

After the visit, Anna escapes and discovers that Lucas is severely disabled, cared for in a facility with a wealthy benefactor. Anna agrees to meet Rembrandt for dinner, where he urges her not to pursue his mysterious employer. After they part, Rembrandt survives a hit ordered by Duquet while Anna finds and kills Duquet at his apartment. She ambushes Rembrandt when he arrives but they give in to their mutual attraction and sleep together.

On the street, Anna is shot by Duquet’s last henchman but is rescued by Moody, who faked his death by disguising his attempted killer as himself. They find out that Rembrandt’s employer is holding a charity banquet at his heavily fortified mansion. Anna infiltrates that banquet disguised as a waiter but is stopped by Rembrandt. Moved to his secure bunker, the employer is confronted by Moody and is revealed to be Edward Hayes.

Edward hired Moody to perform the hit on him years ago, faking his death to hide him, his son, and his criminal empire. Moody tells Edward that he was only looking for Lucas to make amends for killing his father, and that Edward brought all this upon himself, before detonating a bomb, killing Edward and himself.

Badly wounded, Anna escapes to Da Nang to the place where Moody found her as a child. It is revealed that young Anna’s family was attacked by a gang who forced her to watch them kill her parents and sisters. At the gang hideout, she watched the gang leader clean and assemble a pistol before assembling one herself and using it to kill the gang before being rescued by Moody.

Rembrandt arrives, and he and Anna hold each other at gunpoint. A shot is heard before Anna exits the building, alone.

Cast

Production
In October 2017, it was announced that Gong Li had joined the cast of the film, then titled Ana, with Martin Campbell directing from a screenplay by Richard Wenk. In November 2019, it was announced Michael Keaton, Samuel L. Jackson and Maggie Q had joined the cast of the film.

Principal photography began in January 2020 under the title The Asset. Filming took place in Bucharest, London and Da Nang.

Release
The film was released in theatres on August 20, 2021, by Lionsgate. It was previously scheduled to be released on April 23, 2021.

Box office 
In the United States and Canada, The Protégé was released alongside Reminiscence, The Night House, and PAW Patrol: The Movie as well as the limited release of Flag Day and was projected to gross around $5 million from 2,577 theaters in its opening weekend. The film made $1.1 million on its first day, and went on to debut to just $2.9 million, finishing seventh at the box office. The film fell 44% in its second weekend to $1.6 million.

Critical response 
Review aggregator website Rotten Tomatoes reports an approval rating of 62% based on 113 reviews, with an average rating of 5.8/10. The site's critical consensus reads: "Maggie Q's still waiting for the action movie that really deserves her -- but until then, The Protégé hits just hard enough to satisfy." On Metacritic, the film has a weighted average score of 48 out of 100 based on 27 critics, indicating "mixed or average reviews". Audiences polled by CinemaScore gave the film an average grade of "B" on an A+ to F scale, while PostTrak reported 76% of audience members gave it a positive score, with 50% saying they would definitely recommend it.

References

External links
 
 

2021 films
2021 action thriller films
2020s English-language films
American action thriller films
Films about contract killing in the United Kingdom
Films about arms trafficking
Films directed by Martin Campbell
Films scored by Photek
Films set in 1991
Films set in 2021
Films set in Bucharest
Films set in Da Nang
Films set in London
Films shot in Bucharest
Films shot in London
Films shot in Vietnam
Films with screenplays by Richard Wenk
Lionsgate films
2020s American films